This was the first edition of the tournament.

David Goffin won the title, defeating Marsel İlhan in the final, 4–6, 7–5, 6–2.

Seeds

Draw

Finals

Top half

Bottom half

References
 Main Draw
 Qualifying Draw

Eskisehir Cup - Singles
2013 Singles